The 41 ft Watson-class was a non self-righting displacement hull lifeboat built between 1931 and 1952 and operated by the Royal National Lifeboat Institution between 1931 and 1981.

History
The 41 ft Watson was designed for service at stations which required a larger and more powerful boat than the standard carriage launched types, but which could not accommodate the larger Watson types through boathouse or slipway constraints. There was also a beach type with 7 inches more beam and strengthened hulls to withstand the rigours of beach launching. Production ran from 1931 to 1939 and thirteen boats were completed. Between 1948 and 1952 a further five boats were built before attention turned to the much modified  type which appeared in 1954.

Description
The 41 ft Watson had an aft cockpit with a cabin ahead of it containing the engine controls. There was a separate forward shelter and there was room in the two for sixteen people. The boats carried two sails as an auxiliary to the twin Weyburn AE6 6-cylinder petrol engines. The Beach types, as well as being wider, had various differences in deck layout, the first three (ON 751, 761/2) having end boxes and the fourth (ON 783) having raised bulwarks. The type was put back into production in 1948, nine years after the last had been built, in a revised version with an enlarged cabin which replaced the forward shelter. From 1963 eleven of the boats were re-engined with 47 bhp Ford-based Parsons Porbeagle 4-cylinder diesel engines.

Fleet
ON is the RNLIs sequential Official Number.

External links
RNLI